Mysterion (born Christopher Justin Doyle; October 31, 1974) is a Canadian mentalist, magician, collector, comedic writer and occasional wrestling manager.

Career 
Appearing on various television programs and media he is known for his creepy persona.  (Metro, Toronto Star, Bizarre Magazine, PIE magazine, and 24hrs). He has appeared numerous times on MUCHMUSIC and many morning shows (CP24, Breakfast television, Mancow Chicago CHCH, and Global Morning Live) as well as having his oddities collection featured on Baggage Battles and Marilyn Dennis show. From 2004-2005 Mysterion contributed to tabloid The Toronto Special with a comedy horoscope column and prediction article. In 2008 he released a 45 single "Mindreader" which got the cover of Toronto music magazine EYE weekly. Mysterion appeared on the season 3 Kenny vs. Spenny episode "Who Can Stay in a Haunted House the Longest". 

Mysterion is a collector of unusual items from around the world including headhunter trophies, Albino animals and two headed animals. From 2013-2017 Mysterion appeared regularly on Rogers TV Wrestling program Victory Wrestling showcase and live wrestling events as a heel manager and occasional wrestler. 

In 2015 he teamed up with mentalist Steffi Kay to form The Sentimentalists. The Sentimentalists have toured the US and appeared at the Magic Castle as well as the CIA club in Hollywood. In 2016 they were the subject of a BellFibe1 TV documentary "Something Strange". In Nov 2016 Mysterion and Steffi filmed the TV show Billy Goes North, season 1 episode 10 (Magic Mayhem).  l. 

In May 2018, Mysterion appeared on the show Penn & Teller: Fool Us as part of a mind-reading duo The Sentimentalists with Steffi Kay where they successfully fooled the hosts.

In 2019, Mysterion and Steffi Kay appeared together as The Sentimentalists, as contestants on the fourteenth season of America's Got Talent. They successfully moved past the auditions but were eliminated in the judge cuts round of the competition. On August 14 it was announced they were chosen as the wild card and being brought back for the live quarterfinal rounds at the Dolby Theatre. They were again eliminated during the quarterfinals.

In Feb 2020 they appeared on the cover of magic magazine VANISH.  In May 2020 The Sentimentalists were awarded the Allan Slaight award for outstanding achievement in magic: Rising Star. In January 2022 they appeared on the cover and were the feature of Magicseen Magazine.

The Sentimentalists appeared on season one of Canadas Got Talent and advanced to the Semifinals of the competition. They are members of the Magic Castle in Hollywood as well as the Magic Circle in the U.K

References

External links 
 Sleight of Mind
 Blog T.O 
 LAWeekly  
 Tattle Creek 
 The Toronto Star 
 Newswire 
 Post City 
 CityTV 

1974 births
Living people
America's Got Talent contestants
Canadian magicians
Canada's Got Talent contestants